Teachers 4: Top Of The Class is the official soundtrack, on the Channel 4 label, of the fourth series of British television comedy-drama series Teachers.

This album contains music by various artists, heard in the show itself.

Track listing
 "Whatever Happened To Corey Haim?" by The Thrills
 "I'm Shaking" by Rooney
 "Oh My Corazon" by Tim Burgess
 "Just Like Bruce Lee" by Killcity
 "You And Me Against The World" by Her Majesty
 "Evil Eye" by Ash
 "Don't Come Knocking" by The Datsuns
 "What A Waster" by The Libertines
 "Stacy's Mom" by Fountains Of Wayne
 "Together's Better" by Haven
 "Changes Are No Good" by The Stills
 "Seems Fine" by The Concretes
 "You Were Always The One" by The Cribs
 "Long Time Coming" by Delays
 "Celebrity Sanctum" by Dogs Die In Hot Cars
 "You Look So Young" by The Jayhawks
 "The Day It All Went Wrong" by Gisli
 "Magic Carpet" by Unisex
 "Estranged" by The Belles
 "Misread" by Kings Of Convenience

Other songs in the show

External links
 Listen to samples at Last.fm
 Teachers: Top Of The Class at Play.com
 Top Of The Class on Amazon

Television soundtracks
2004 soundtrack albums